Deal is a borough in Monmouth County, in the U.S. state of New Jersey, settled by Europeans in the mid-1660s and named after an English carpenter from Deal, Kent. As of the 2020 United States census, the borough's population was 900, an increase of 150 (+20.0%) from the 2010 census count of 750, which in turn reflected a decline of 320 (−29.9%) from the 1,070 counted in the 2000 census.

Deal is home to a significant population of Orthodox Sephardic Jews, mainly of Syrian origin. As much as 80% of Deal's population are Sephardi Jews, and the year-round population jumps ten-fold to over 6,000 during the summer, many of them Syrian Jews. In the 2000 Census, 16.4% of Deal residents identified as being of Syrian heritage, the greatest percentage of Syrian Americans in any municipality in the country.  Most of the town consisted of homes close to or over one hundred years old in the Victorian and American Foursquare styles.

In 2007, Deal was ranked by Forbes magazine as the 13th most expensive ZIP Code in the nation with a median sale price of $1,825,000. It was also named the 4th most expensive zip code in New Jersey in 2017, with a median sale price of $1,207,500. In 2019, PropertyShark ranked Deal in a tie with 94110 in San Francisco as the 85th most expensive ZIP Code in the country, and second-highest in New Jersey, with a median sales price of $1,500,000. Then again in 2021, it was ranked as the second most expensive zip code in New Jersey with a typical home value of $2,141,154  Then in 2022 it was ranked as the #1 most expensive zip code in New Jersey with homes valued at $2,400,000.

History
A group from Rhode Island settled in the area of Middletown Township and Shrewsbury Township in the mid-1660s, after having purchased what was known as the Monmouth Patent. Thomas Whyte, an English carpenter from the shore-side community of Deal, Kent, acquired  in Shrewsbury Township along the shore that became known as "Deal", from the name of the English town. Present-day Norwood Avenue dates back to the early 18th century construction of the Long Branch-Deal Turnpike.

On August 14, 1829, at 11:30 PM local time, the fall of a meteorite was observed. The meteorite was officially named "Deal" and it was classified as an ordinary chondrite L.

Deal was incorporated as a borough on March 7, 1898, by an act of the New Jersey Legislature, from portions of Ocean Township.

In summer 2009, several residents of Deal were involved in a scandal called Operation Bid Rig, which involved public corruption, money laundering and trafficking of human organs.

Geography
According to the U.S. Census Bureau, the borough had a total area of 1.32 square miles (3.42 km2), including 1.18 square miles (3.07 km2) of land and 0.14 square miles (0.35 km2) of water (10.30%). The borough's beaches have been expanded significantly due to reclamation of the beach by way of dredging.

Unincorporated communities, localities and place names located partially or completely within the borough include South Elberon.

The borough borders the Monmouth County communities of Allenhurst, Long Branch, and Ocean Township.

Demographics

2010 census

The Census Bureau's 2006–2010 American Community Survey showed that (in 2010 inflation-adjusted dollars) median household income was $59,615 (with a margin of error of +/− $17,199) and the median family income was $95,833 (+/− $32,359). Males had a median income of $52,625 (+/− $17,303) versus $25,139 (+/− $4,348) for females. The per capita income for the borough was $46,867 (+/− $8,038). About 4.1% of families and 6.7% of the population were below the poverty line, including 7.4% of those under age 18 and 3.6% of those age 65 or over.

2000 census
As of the 2000 U.S. census, there were 1,070 people, 434 households, and 289 families residing in the borough. The population density was 880.5 people per square mile (338.6/km2). There were 953 housing units at an average density of 784.3 per square mile (301.6/km2). The racial makeup of the borough was 94.39% White, 1.21% African American, 0.09% Native American, 0.28% Asian, 2.71% from other races, and 1.31% from two or more races. Hispanic or Latino people of any race were 5.05% of the population.

There were 434 households, out of which 19.8% had children under the age of 18 living with them, 56.2% were married couples living together, 7.1% had a female householder with no husband present, and 33.2% were non-families. 29.0% of all households were made up of individuals, and 13.6% had someone living alone who was 65 years of age or older. The average household size was 2.46 and the average family size was 3.02.

In the borough the population was spread out, with 20.5% under the age of 18, 7.9% from 18 to 24, 21.9% from 25 to 44, 23.0% from 45 to 64, and 26.7% who were 65 years of age or older. The median age was 45 years. For every 100 females, there were 100.0 males. For every 100 females age 18 and over, there were 94.7 males.

The median income for a household in the borough was $58,472, and the median income for a family was $65,313. Males had a median income of $57,857 versus $27,813 for females. The per capita income for the borough was $38,510. About 7.8% of families and 11.2% of the population were below the poverty line, including 14.0% of those under age 18 and 6.6% of those age 65 or over.

Government

Local government 
Deal is governed under the Walsh Act form of government. The borough is one of 30 municipalities (of the 564) statewide that use the commission form of government. The governing body consists of three commissioners, who are elected at-large on a non-partisan basis to serve concurrent four-year terms of office as part of the May municipal election. Each commissioner is assigned a department to administer and oversee; the commissioners select one of their members to serve as mayor.

, members of the Deal Committee are Mayor Samuel M. Cohen (Commissioner of Public Affairs and Public Safety), Morris Ades (Commissioner of Revenue and Finance) and David Simhon (Commissioner of Public Works, Parks and Public Property), all serving concurrent terms of office ending May 15, 2024.

Mayor Harry Franco, who had first been elected as a commissioner, died on January 30, 2013.

Federal, state, and county representation
Deal is located in the 6th Congressional District and is part of New Jersey's 11th state legislative district.

 

Monmouth County is governed by a Board of County Commissioners comprised of five members who are elected at-large to serve three year terms of office on a staggered basis, with either one or two seats up for election each year as part of the November general election. At an annual reorganization meeting held in the beginning of January, the board selects one of its members to serve as Director and another as Deputy Director. , Monmouth County's Commissioners are
Commissioner Director Thomas A. Arnone (R, Neptune City, term as commissioner and as director ends December 31, 2022), 
Commissioner Deputy Director Susan M. Kiley (R, Hazlet Township, term as commissioner ends December 31, 2024; term as deputy commissioner director ends 2022),
Lillian G. Burry (R, Colts Neck Township, 2023), Nick DiRocco (R, Wall Township, 2022), and Ross F. Licitra (R, Marlboro Township, 2023). Constitutional officers elected on a countywide basis are County clerk Christine Giordano Hanlon (R, 2025; Ocean Township), 
Sheriff Shaun Golden (R, 2022; Howell Township), and Surrogate Rosemarie D. Peters (R, 2026; Middletown Township).

Politics
As of March 2011, there were a total of 616 registered voters in Deal, of which 113 (18.3%) were registered as Democrats, 146 (23.7%) were registered as Republicans and 357 (58.0%) were registered as Unaffiliated. There were no voters registered to other parties.

In the 2012 presidential election, Republican Mitt Romney received 71.4% of the vote (225 cast), ahead of Democrat Barack Obama with 27.9% (88 votes), and other candidates with 0.6% (2 votes), among the 316 ballots cast by the borough's 602 registered voters (1 ballot was spoiled), for a turnout of 52.5%. In the 2008 presidential election, Republican John McCain received 71.0% of the vote (303 cast), ahead of Democrat Barack Obama with 25.8% (110 votes) and other candidates with 0.5% (2 votes), among the 427 ballots cast by the borough's 678 registered voters, for a turnout of 63.0%. In the 2004 presidential election, Republican George W. Bush received 66.7% of the vote (314 ballots cast), outpolling Democrat John Kerry with 32.1% (151 votes) and other candidates with 0.5% (4 votes), among the 471 ballots cast by the borough's 768 registered voters, for a turnout percentage of 61.3.

In the 2013 gubernatorial election, Republican Chris Christie received 75.8% of the vote (122 cast), ahead of Democrat Barbara Buono with 22.4% (36 votes), and other candidates with 1.9% (3 votes), among the 163 ballots cast by the borough's 597 registered voters (2 ballots were spoiled), for a turnout of 27.3%. In the 2009 gubernatorial election, Republican Chris Christie received 65.4% of the vote (172 ballots cast), ahead of Democrat Jon Corzine with 31.6% (83 votes) and Independent Chris Daggett with 3.0% (8 votes), among the 263 ballots cast by the borough's 654 registered voters, yielding a 40.2% turnout.

Education
Deal School District serves public school students in kindergarten through eighth grade at Deal School. As of the 2018–19 school year, the district, comprised of one school, had an enrollment of 169 students and 17.1 classroom teachers (on an FTE basis), for a student–teacher ratio of 9.9:1. In the 2016–17 school year, Deal had the 35th-smallest enrollment of any school district in the state, with 165 students. In the 2013–2014 school year, nearly 90% of the district's enrollment was from students participating in the Interdistrict Public School Choice Program, for whom the state paid the district $12,500 in supplemental aid per student.

For ninth through twelfth grades, students attend Shore Regional High School, as part of a sending/receiving relationship. As of the 2018–19 school year, the high school had an enrollment of 649 students and 57.2 classroom teachers (on an FTE basis), for a student–teacher ratio of 11.3:1. The relationship with Shore Regional succeeds a previous agreement under which students from Deal attended Asbury Park High School in neighboring Asbury Park as part of a sending/receiving relationship with the Asbury Park Public Schools.

Students also have the option to attend Academy Charter High School in Lake Como, which accepts students on a lottery basis from the communities of Allenhurst, Asbury Park, Avon-by-the-Sea, Belmar, Bradley Beach, Deal, Interlaken and Lake Como.

Houses of worship
Area synagogues and churches include:
 Edmond J. Safra Synagogue of Deal, the Hathaway Avenue Synagogue (Orthodox, Syrian traditions)
 Bet Yosef, Hechal Shaul Synagogue, Ahaba Ve Ahva (Orthodox, Syrian traditions, Egyptian traditions)
 Magen David of West Deal, (Orthodox, Syrian traditions)
 Ohel Yaakob, the Lawrence Avenue Synagogue (Orthodox, Syrian traditions)
 Ohel Simha, the Park Avenue Synagogue (Orthodox, Syrian traditions)
 Synagogue of Deal (Orthodox, Syrian traditions)
 Saint Mary's of the Assumption, at Richmond Avenue (Roman Catholic)
 Joseph S. Jemal Synagogue of Deal extension of the Hathaway Synagogue (Orthodox, Syrian traditions)

Transportation

Roads and highways

Route 7 is the only state highway serving Deal directly. However, several other highways are accessible in neighboring towns, including Route 35, Route 18, Route 66, and the Garden State Parkway.

Public transportation
NJ Transit provides local bus transportation on the 837 route. NJ Transit service on the North Jersey Coast Line is available at the Allenhurst and Elberon stations.

Climate
According to the Köppen climate classification system, Deal has a humid subtropical climate (Cfa). Cfa climates are characterized by all months having an average temperature > , at least four months with an average temperature ≥ , at least one month with an average temperature ≥  and no significant precipitation difference between seasons. Although most summer days are slightly humid with a cooling afternoon sea breeze in Deal, episodes of heat and high humidity can occur with heat index values > . July is the peak in thunderstorm activity and the average wettest month is August. Episodes of extreme cold and wind can occur with wind chill values < .

Ecology
According to the A. W. Kuchler U.S. potential natural vegetation types, Deal would have a dominant vegetation type of Appalachian Oak (104) with a dominant vegetation form of Eastern Hardwood Forest (25). The average date of first spring leaf-out is March 24 and fall color typically peaks in early-November.

Notable people

People who were born in, residents of, or otherwise closely associated with Deal include:
 Rudolf Bauer (1889–1953), German-born painter who was involved in the avant-garde group Der Sturm in Berlin, and whose work would become central to the Non-Objective art collection of Solomon R. Guggenheim
 Joseph Cayre (born 1941), investor and owner of Midtown Equities
 Stanley Chera (1942–2020), real estate developer
 Nadine Epstein, journalist and author; editor in chief and CEO of Moment magazine
 George K. Fraenkel (1921–2009), physical chemist
 Tom Gallagher (1940–2018), diplomat; in 1976, became the first officer of the United States Foreign Service to come out as gay
 Frank Hague (1876–1956), Mayor of Jersey City, 1917–1947
 Huntington Hartford (1911–2008), businessman, philanthropist, stage and film producer, and art collector; heir to the A&P supermarket fortune
 Sean T. Kean (born 1963), politician; has served in the New Jersey General Assembly since being sworn into office on January 10, 2012, representing the 30th Legislative District
 Albert Laboz, real estate developer
 David Rockwell (born 1956), architect and designer
 Patti Scialfa (born 1953), member of the E Street Band and wife of Bruce Springsteen
 P. Hal Sims (1886–1949) and Dorothy Rice Sims (1889–1960), contract bridge celebrities and experts whose home in Deal was a headquarters and retreat for authorities on the game, 1920s–1930s
 Joseph Sitt (born 1964), real estate investor, founder of the retail chain Ashley Stewart, and founder of global real estate company Thor Equities
 Maxine Stuart (1918–2013), actress
 Jeff Sutton (born 1960), real estate developer, billionaire, founder of Wharton Properties
 Jeffrey Vinik (born 1959), investor and owner of the NHL's Tampa Bay Lightning

References

External links

 Deal Borough website
 Deal School District
 
 School Data for the Deal School District, National Center for Education Statistics

 
1898 establishments in New Jersey
Boroughs in Monmouth County, New Jersey
Jersey Shore communities in Monmouth County
Orthodox Jewish communities
Populated places established in 1898
Sephardi Jewish culture in New Jersey
Syrian-Jewish culture in the United States
Walsh Act